Child pornography and the growing commercial sexual exploitation of children in the Philippines have resulted in moves to combat this. In 2016, UNICEF declared that the Philippines is one of the top sources of child pornography.

UNICEF Manila study
According to a book by Arnie Trinidad entitled Child Pornography in the Philippines published by UNICEF Manila, a prominent case happened in Pagsanjan, Laguna, a rural community South of Manila. The case, according to Trinidad, involved the victimization of 590 children and adolescents aged 7 to 17 years old, by 22 American and European pedophiles who were involved in the production of pornography, drug abuse, and the sexual abuse of children. The study, published in 2005, documents other cases perpetrated by both foreign and local pedophiles and includes in depth analysis of the ongoing problem, in the context of the social, economic and legal environment.

The UNICEF Manila study states that social factors increase the propensity of children to be victimized in pornography. Among these are the commercial sexual exploitation of children, sex tourism, poverty, peer influence, availability of technology, cultural factors, among others.

Convention on the Rights of the Child
In 2003, the Philippines ratified their signing of the United Nations Optional Protocol to the Convention on the Rights of the Child on the Sale of Children, Child Prostitution and Child Pornography; the protocol requires its signatories to recognize child pornography as a crime against children and to treat any act that contributes to production or distribution of child pornography as a criminal offense, within two years of ratification.  Although fully compliant comprehensive legislation has not yet been enacted, Philippine law criminalizes the use of children in any aspect of the production or distribution of pornography, defining a "child" as younger than 18 years; and with maximum penalties required if the child involved is younger than 12 years old.

Anti-Child Pornography Alliance
On September 15, 2007, the Children and Youth Secretariat of the Anti-Child Pornography Alliance (ACPA-Pilipinas) in the Philippines launched Batingaw Network "to protect and save children from all forms of abuses and exploitations." It is the largest anti-child pornography movement in the Philippines to date. It declared September 28 as the National Day of Awareness and Unity against Child Pornography.

See also
 Legality of child pornography

References

Child pornography
Law of the Philippines
Philippine pornography
Pornography
Children's rights in the Philippines